The Advocate-General of Madras was charged with advising the Government of the British administered Madras Presidency on legal matters. The Presidency existed from 1652 to 1950. Prior to 1858, when it was administered by the East India Company, the Advocate-General was the senior law officer of that company and also the Attorney-General of the Sovereign of Great Britain and an ex-officio member of the Madras Legislative Council.

List of Advocates-General

Madras Presidency 

Alexander Anstruther 1803–?1812
Sir Samuel Toller 1812–1821
Herbert Abingdon Draper Compton 1822–1828 
George Norton 1828–>1839 
W. Bathie 1833–1834 (acting)
Thomas Sydney Smith 1861–1863
John Bruce Norton 1863–1868 
John Dawson Mayne 1868–1872 (acting)
Henry Stewart Cunningham 1872–1877
Patrick O'Sullivan 1877–1882
Hale Horatio Shephard 1885–1887
James Spring Branson 1887–1897 
V. Bhashyam Aiyangar 1897–1898 (acting)
Charles Arnold White 1898–1899 (afterwards Chief Justice of Madras, 1899)
V. Bhashyam Aiyangar 1899–1900 (acting)
John Edward Power Wallis 1900–1906 (later Chief Justice of Madras, 1914)
C. Sankaran Nair 1906-1907
P. S. Sivaswami Iyer 1907–1912
S. Srinivasa Iyengar 1912–1920
C. P. Ramaswami Iyer 1920–1923
C. Madhavan Nair 1923-1924
T. R. Venkatarama Sastri 1924–1928
Alladi Krishnaswamy Iyer 1929–1944
P. V. Rajamannar 1944–1945 (later Chief Justice of Madras, 1948)
K. Rajah Iyer 1945–1950

Madras State 
 V. K. Thiruvenkatachari 1950 - 1964
 N. Krishnaswami Reddy 1964 - 1966
 Mohan Kumaramangalam 1966 - 1967

Tamil Nadu
 Govind Swaminadhan 1967 - 1976
 K. Parasaran 1976 - 1977
 V. P. Raman 1977 - 1979
 R. Krishnamoorthy 1980 - 1989
 K. Subramaniam 1991 - 1994
 R. Krishnamoorthy 1994 - 1996
 K.V.Venkatapathi 1996 - 2001
 N. R. Chandran 2001 - 2006
 R. Viduthalai 2006 - 2007
 G. Masilamani 2007 - 2009
 P. S. Raman 2009 - 2011
 A. Navaneethakrishnan 2011 - 2013
 A. L. Somayaji 2013 - 2016
 R. Muthukumarasamy 2016-2017
 Vijay Narayan 2017-2021
 R. Shunmugasundaram 2021

References

Madras
Advocates General for Tamil Nadu